Max Joseph Kranick (born July 21, 1997) is an American professional baseball pitcher for the Pittsburgh Pirates of Major League Baseball (MLB).

Amateur career
Kranick attended Valley View High School in Archbald, Pennsylvania. For his high school career, he compiled a 1.17 ERA. After his senior year, he was selected by the Pittsburgh Pirates in the 11th round of the 2016 Major League Baseball draft. He signed for $300,000, forgoing his commitment to the University of Virginia.

Professional career
Kranick made his professional debut that summer with the Rookie-level Gulf Coast League Pirates, going 1–2 with a 2.43 ERA over nine games (six starts). In 2017, he split time between the Gulf Coast League and the Bristol Pirates of the Rookie-level Appalachian League, compiling a combined 1–0 record and 1.11 ERA over five starts. He spent 2018 with the West Virginia Power of the Class A South Atlantic League, going 4–5 with a 3.81 ERA over 17 games (16 starts), and 2019 with the Bradenton Marauders of the Class A-Advanced Florida State League, pitching to a 6–7 record and 3.79 ERA over twenty starts.

On November 20, 2020, Kranick was added to Pittsburgh's 40-man roster. He did not play a minor league game in 2020 due to the cancellation of the minor league season caused by the COVID-19 pandemic. To begin the 2021 season, he was assigned to the Altoona Curve of the Double-A Northeast. In late May, he was promoted to the Indianapolis Indians of the Triple-A East League.

On June 27, 2021, Kranick was promoted to the major leagues to make his MLB debut as the starting pitcher versus the St. Louis Cardinals. He threw five perfect innings, striking out three batters, before a rain delay occurred and he was removed. He set the record for the most batters retired to begin a major league career with 15. Over nine starts with the Pirates, Kranick went 2-3 with a 6.28 ERA and 32 strikeouts over  innings.

Kranick opened the 2022 season with Indianapolis before he underwent Tommy John surgery in early June, forcing him out indefinitely.

References

External links

1997 births
Living people
Sportspeople from Scranton, Pennsylvania
Baseball players from Pennsylvania
Major League Baseball pitchers
Pittsburgh Pirates players
Gulf Coast Pirates players
Bristol Pirates players
West Virginia Power players
Bradenton Marauders players
Altoona Curve players
Indianapolis Indians players
Peoria Javelinas players